The 2019 New York Red Bulls season was the club's twenty-fourth season in Major League Soccer, the top division of soccer in the United States.

Team information

Squad information

Appearances and goals are career totals from all-competitions.

Roster transactions

In

Out

Total expenditure: $2,500,000

Total revenue: $3,000,000

Net income: $500,000

Draft picks

Preseason and Friendlies

Preseason

Major League Soccer season

Eastern Conference

Overall

Results summary

Matches

MLS Cup Playoffs

U.S. Open Cup

New York will enter the 2019 U.S. Open Cup with the rest of Major League Soccer in the fourth round.

CONCACAF Champions League

Round of 16

Quarter-finals

Competitions summary
As of 20 October 2019.

Player statistics

As of 20 October 2019.

|-
! colspan="14" style="background:#dcdcdc; text-align:center"| Goalkeepers

|-
! colspan="14" style="background:#dcdcdc; text-align:center"| Defenders

|-
! colspan="14" style="background:#dcdcdc; text-align:center"| Midfielders

|-
! colspan="14" style="background:#dcdcdc; text-align:center"| Forwards

|-
! colspan="14" style="background:#dcdcdc; text-align:center"| Left Club During Season

|}

Top scorers

As of 20 October 2019.

Assist Leaders

As of 20 October 2019.
This table does not include secondary assists.

Shutouts 

As of 20 October 2019.

Disciplinary record 

As of 20 October 2019.

References

New York Red Bulls
New York Red Bulls
New York Red Bulls
New York Red Bulls seasons
New York